John Voce (born 7 January 1963, Bicester) is an English actor.  He has portrayed William Kempe in the period drama A Waste of Shame (2005) and the recurring character Tim Parker in Primeval (2007).   He has also appeared in the 2001 film Crush and the 2008 film Penelope. He is the father of four children called Alfie, Jeanie, Lenny and Ava, and has appeared in many adverts such as "Zoopla - Pounds" (2010–2011). He belongs to the agency  and has also done voiceovers for Leapfrog self-reader books.

External links

People from Bicester
Living people
English male television actors
1963 births
English male film actors